The 1955 German football championship was the culmination of the football season in West Germany in 1954-55. Rot-Weiss Essen were crowned champions for the first time after a group stage and a final.

It was Rot-Weiss Essen's first (and only) appearance in the German final, while Kaiserslautern were making their fifth appearance. It was also the fourth time Kaiserlautern had reached the final in five years, following their championship wins in 1951 and 1953, and their defeat in 1954.

The format used to determine the German champions was different from that which was used in the 1954 season. Nine teams qualified for the tournament, with those who qualified as a runner-up having to play qualifying matches. The remaining eight teams were split into two groups of four, and played two rounds of matches with games played home and away. The two group winners then played the national final.

Qualified teams
The teams qualified through the 1954–55 Oberliga season:

Competition

First qualifying round

Replay

Second qualifying round

Group 1

Group 2

Final

Sources
 1954-55 at Weltfussball.de
 Germany - Championship 1955 at RSSSF.com
 German championship 1955 at Fussballdaten.de

1955
1